Dip Kumar Upadhaya is a leader of Nepali Congress, and former Minister for Culture, Tourism, and Civil Aviation. he is former ambassador of Nepal for India. He resigned from the post and returned to compete in election of House of Representative in 2074 but was defeated by Chakrapani Khanal 'Baldev' From Kaplivastu. Nepal as t In the 2008 Constituent Assembly election he was elected from the Kapilvastu-1 constituency, winning 12997 votes.

References

Government ministers of Nepal
Living people
Nepali Congress politicians from Lumbini Province
Year of birth missing (living people)
Members of the 1st Nepalese Constituent Assembly
Nepal MPs 1994–1999
Nepal MPs 1991–1994